The Oliver Gould Jennings House is a mansion located at 7 East 72nd Street on the Upper East Side of New York City. It was originally constructed in 1898 for Oliver Gould Jennings in the French Beaux-Arts style. It was used as a temporary location of the Solomon R. Guggenheim Museum from 1956 to 1959. In 1964, it became part of the Lycée Français de New York in the neighboring Henry T. Sloane House.

The mansion was in turn vacated by the school when it was sold and renovated to become a luxurious single-family home again. The purchaser of the building was Hamad bin Khalifa Al Thani, the (now former) Emir of Qatar, who bought the mansion and the neighboring Henry T. Sloane House around 2004.

See also
National Register of Historic Places listings in Manhattan from 59th to 110th Streets
List of New York City Designated Landmarks in Manhattan from 59th to 110th Streets

References

Further reading

External links

Upper East Side
Houses in Manhattan
New York City Designated Landmarks in Manhattan
Beaux-Arts architecture in New York City
Houses completed in 1898
1898 establishments in New York City
Gilded Age mansions